Chris Date (born 1941) is an independent author, lecturer, researcher, and consultant, specializing in relational database theory.

Biography
Chris Date attended High Wycombe Royal Grammar School (U.K.) from 1951 to 1958 and received his BA in Mathematics from Cambridge University (U.K.) in 1962. He entered the computer business as a mathematical programmer at Leo Computers Ltd. (London), where he quickly moved into education and training. In 1966, he earned his master's degree at Cambridge, and, in 1967, he joined IBM Hursley (UK) as a computer programming instructor. Between 1969 and 1974, he was a principal instructor in IBM's European education program.

While working at IBM he was involved in technical planning and design for the IBM products SQL/DS and DB2.
He was also involved with Edgar F. Codd’s relational model for database management.  
He left IBM in 1983 and has written extensively of the relational model, in association with Hugh Darwen.

As of 2007 his book An Introduction to Database Systems, currently in its 8th edition, has sold well over 700,000 copies not counting translations, and is used by several hundred colleges and universities worldwide.

He is also the author of many other books on data management, most notably Databases, Types, and the Relational Model, subtitled and commonly referred to as The Third Manifesto, currently in its third edition (note that earlier editions were titled differently, but maintained the same subtitle), a proposal for the future direction of DBMSs.

Works
Chris Date is the author of several books, including:
 An Introduction to Database Systems, 2004, 
 A Guide to the SQL standard, 4th ed., Addison Wesley, USA 1997, 
 Databases, Types, and the Relational Model, The Third Manifesto (with Hugh Darwen), 2007, 
 Temporal Data & the Relational Model, 2003, 
 Database in Depth: Relational Theory for Practitioners, 2005, 
 What Not How: The Business Rules Approach to Application Development, 2000,  
 The Database Relational Model: A Retrospective Review and Analysis, 2001, 
 SQL and Relational Theory, 2nd Edition: How to Write Accurate SQL Code, 2011, .

In recent years he has published articles with Fabian Pascal at Database Debunkings.

See also
Nikos Lorentzos
David McGoveran
Fabian Pascal
Lex de Haan

References

IBM employees
Database researchers
1941 births
Living people
People from Watford
People educated at the Royal Grammar School, High Wycombe